Becky Yee (born July 4, 1969) is an American portrait photographer and the founder of Around Digital Media.

Becky Yee Photography 
Upon moving back to New York in 2008, Yee has been busy with exhibitions and also reestablishing herself as a versatile photographer in her editorial, commercial and curated work. Her work was displayed at the 2008 Media Facades Festival in Berlin, Germany.  One of her first exhibitions was "More Than A Woman" at HPGRP Gallery.  This was a controversial exhibition that chronicles a man in Tokyo, who proclaims to be the world's largest collector of "Dutch Wives" (Datchu-waifu) with over 70 anatomically correct, life-sized sex dolls. Yee continues to develop projects and exhibitions that utilize photography, video, music and other media to create unique images that show the provocative and vulnerable side of her subjects and topics.

Select Exhibitions/Projects 
 2011-Back to the Streets—書店外里帰り - Sakura Matsuri, Solo Photography Exhibition, Brooklyn Botanical Garden, Brooklyn, NY, USA
"Back to the Streets” at the Nakaochiai Gallery
 More Than a Woman, Solo Photography Exhibition, HPGRP Gallery – Meatpacking District, New York, NY, USA,

Books/Publications/Periodicals 
 2009 More Than A Woman - HPGRP Gallery Publishing, USA
 2005 Xtreme Fashions - Prestel Books, Munich, Berlin, London, New York
 Schmuck Quickies - Middlesbrough Institute of Modern Art Publications, Great Britain
 2003 Yuka Oyama Tokamachi Catalogue - Tokamachi Publication, Japan
 2002 Yoichi Nagasawa Retrospective - Tankosha Publishing, Japan

Awards 
 2009 Critics Picks, ArtForum, New York, “More Than A Woman” solo exhibition
 2009 Best in Show, Village Voice, “More Than A Woman” solo exhibition
 2009 Voice Choices, “Village Voice, More Than A Woman” solo exhibition
 2008 International Photography Cup – Nudes, Red Box Project, London, England
 2005 PDN Photo Annual, Photo Products Design, Prohibit Men’s Fashion Catalog, New York, NY

Education 
 1998 Hokkaido University, Summer Exchange Scholarship, Sapporo, Japan
 1997 Cornell University, FALCon Program (Japanese), Ithaca, New York
 1991 State University of New York at Buffalo, Bachelor of Arts, College of Arts and Science Department of Communications,Buffalo, New York

References

External links 
 - Becky Yee Photography-Official Site
 - Around Digital Media-Official Site

1969 births
Living people
University at Buffalo alumni
Fashion photographers
Cornell University alumni
American people of Chinese descent
Photographers from New York City
American portrait photographers
American women photographers
21st-century American women